Better Holdco, Inc. (Better or Better.com) is an American company which operates an online platform for mortgage origination and related services. Founded in 2014 by chief executive officer Vishal Garg, the company launched its first business, Better Mortgage, in 2016 and later added subsidiaries dedicated to real estate, title and homeowners' insurance services. The company is backed by SoftBank and Novator, and in 2020 it secured a US$4 billion valuation. The company is headquartered at 3 World Trade Center in Lower Manhattan.

History

Incorporation and growth
In 2014 Vishal Garg incorporated Better as "Better Holdco, Inc." In an interview, Garg said that he and his wife had a negative experience obtaining a mortgage to buy their own first home, which led directly to the company's formation.

In 2016 the company launched Better Mortgage and secured $30 million in Series A funding. The company was approved the same year to be a Fannie Mae seller/servicer. Better raised Series B funding in the amount of $15 million in 2017 with Kleiner Perkins, Goldman Sachs, and Pine Brook Partners. The company launched two additional subsidiaries in 2018; Better Real Estate and Better Settlement Services. A year later, the company launched a fourth subsidiary, Better Cover, and raised $160 million in Series C funding led by Activant Capital. In April, Ally Home announced they were partnering with Better.com to launch their own digital mortgage platform. Ally also made a contribution to the Series C round. The company raised Series D funding of $200 million, led by L Catterton, in 2020. In April 2021, the company raised an additional $500 million from Japanese investment conglomerate SoftBank, resulting in a $6 billion valuation.

Better Holdco gained high profile coverage for its quick rise and practices. The number of people from traditionally underrepresented groups buying homes through Better's mortgage lending platform increased significantly in 2019, a development that The New York Times suggested was linked to the company's digital processes and minimal reliance on human brokers.

In May 2021, Better announced that it planned to go public via a SPAC merger with Aurora Acquisition Corp before the end of 2021. Later that same year, Better acquired Trussle, a UK digital mortgage broker, and in September 2021 it acquired Property Partner, a London-based crowdfunding platform. In November 2021, the company formed a new agreement with backers Aurora Acquisition Corp. and SoftBank, and received thereby a $750M cash infusion.  In August 2022, Better.com's deadline to go public via a SPAC was delayed until March 2023.

Layoffs and controversy
On December 6, 2021, a video of Garg laying off 900 employees by videoconference and locking out their devices became widely disseminated. After much criticism, Garg decided to take time off from the company, but returned in January 2022. 

In March 2022, news reports surfaced that some Better.com employees started receiving severance pay before Better.com told them they were to be laid off. On March 8, 2022, the company announced that 3,000 people, or approximately one-third of their employees, were laid off in an effort to streamline their business operations.

In June 2022, a former senior executive at Better filed a lawsuit alleging that the company misled investors in its financial filings and other representations while it tried to go public. Not long afterwards, three of its senior executives left the company.

In August 2022, a list of 250 or more US-based employees who were about to be terminated in a fourth round of layoffs was leaked internally, apparently leading to the termination of the employees who leaked the information.

Operations 
Better sells mortgages to about 30 secondary mortgage investors, including Fannie Mae and Wells Fargo. The company obtains leads from personal finance companies such as Credit Karma and NerdWallet in order to attract customers and market to them.

References

External Links 
 

Online financial services companies of the United States